Richard Joseph Dvorak (born April 21, 1952) is a former American football defensive end who played four seasons in the National Football League with the New York Giants and Miami Dolphins. He was drafted by the New York Giants in the third round of the 1974 NFL Draft. He played college football at Wichita State University and attended Spearville High School in Spearville, Kansas.

References

External links
Just Sports Stats

Living people
1952 births
Players of American football from Kansas
American football defensive ends
Wichita State Shockers football players
New York Giants players
Miami Dolphins players
People from Ford County, Kansas